The Burlington County Institute of Technology (BCIT) is a county-wide public school district that serves the vocational and technical education needs of students at the high school and post-secondary level in Burlington County, New Jersey, United States. BCIT's more than 2,000 students come from 38 sending school districts throughout the county.

BCIT has campuses in Medford and Westampton townships. Admission to BCIT is based on a competitive admissions test. The district develops apprenticeship and job training programs with local businesses and educational institutions.

As of the 2020–21 school year, the district, comprised of two schools, had an enrollment of 2,135 students and 155.5 classroom teachers (on an FTE basis), for a student–teacher ratio of 13.7:1.

Campuses
The district's two campuses (with 2020–21 enrollment data from the National Center for Education Statistics) are:
Burlington County Institute of Technology Medford Campus (896 students)
Burlington County Institute of Technology Westampton Campus (1,241 students)

Programs
BCIT offers educational programs in a broad range of fields:
High tech: Electronics, Computer Science Applications, Computer Assisted Drafting and Office Technologies, Robotics, Pre-engineering, A+ and NET+.
Traditional majors: Automotive Technology, Printing/Graphics Communication, Welding, Drafting, Heating Ventilation and Air Conditioning, Fleet Maintenance Mechanics and Auto Body Repair are certified by the respective industries. Cosmetology and Health Occupations must pass licensing exams upon completion of their educational programs. Building Trade, Electrical Trade and Office Technology students in the high school program enroll in apprenticeships during their senior year.
Other: Geospatial Technologies, Veterinarian Assistant, Ornamental Horticulture, Marketing, Culinary Arts, Advertising, Art and Design, Early Childhood Education and Child Care, Fashion Design and Fabrication, Law and Public Safety and Sports Medicine.

Administration
Core members of the district's administration are:
Dr. Christopher Nagy, Superintendent of Schools
Andrew C. Willmott, Business Administrator / Board Secretary

Board of education 
The district's board of education is comprised of the county superintendent of schools and six public members who set policy and oversee the fiscal and educational operation of the district through its administration. As a Type I school district, the board's trustees are appointed by the Burlington County Board of County Commissioners to serve four-year terms of office on a staggered basis, with either one or two members up for reappointment each year. The board appoints a superintendent to oversee the day-to-day operation of the district.

References

External links

Data for the Burlington County Institute of Technology, National Center for Education Statistics

School districts in Burlington County, New Jersey
Vocational school districts in New Jersey
Westampton Township, New Jersey